Sergio Verdú (born Barcelona, Spain, August 15, 1958) is a former professor of electrical engineering and specialist in information theory. Until September 22, 2018, he was the Eugene Higgins Professor of Electrical Engineering at Princeton University, where he taught and conducted research on information theory in the Information Sciences and Systems Group. He was also affiliated with the program in Applied and Computational Mathematics. He was dismissed from the faculty following a university investigation of alleged sexual misconduct.

Verdu received the Telecommunications Engineering degree from the Polytechnic University of Catalonia, Barcelona, Spain, in 1980 and the PhD degree in Electrical Engineering from the University of Illinois at Urbana-Champaign in 1984. Conducted at the Coordinated Science Laboratory of the University of Illinois, his doctoral research was supervised by Vincent Poor and pioneered the field of multiuser detection. In 1998, his book Multiuser Detection was published by Cambridge University Press.

Sexual harassment incident and dismissal from tenured position
A Title IX investigation by Princeton, made public in 2017 by the Huffington Post, concluded that Verdú had sexually harassed one of his graduate students, a South Korean woman. According to the student, Verdú was required only to attend an 8-hour training session as a consequence. The student changed advisers and changed her research topic. A university spokesperson denied the claim that additional training was the only consequence for Verdú, stating that "penalties were imposed in addition to the required counseling", but did not identify what those penalties were. According to the Princeton Dean of Faculty, there were allegations that Verdú had also harassed others, but only the one student was willing to make a formal complaint. Verdú denied the findings of the investigation, stating: "The university advised me not to reply but I categorically deny that there were any advances or any sexual harassment."
He was subsequently dismissed from Princeton University as of September 22, 2018, following further consideration by the university, which said that "an investigation established that Dr. Verdu violated the university's policy prohibiting consensual relations with students, and its policy requiring honesty and cooperation in university matters".

Awards and honors
IEEE Fellow (1993)
Frederick Emmons Terman Award from the American Society for Engineering Education (2000)
IEEE Third Millennium Medal (2000)
Doctorate Honoris Causa from the Polytechnic University of Catalonia (2005)
Member of the National Academy of Engineering (2007)
Member of the National Academy of Sciences (2014)
Corresponding Member of the Royal Academy of Engineering of Spain  (2013)
Claude E. Shannon Award from the IEEE Information Theory Society (2007)
IEEE Richard W. Hamming Medal (2008)
NAS Award for Scientific Reviewing (2016)

His papers have received several awards:

1992 IEEE Donald G. Fink Prize Paper Award
1998 Information Theory Paper Award from the IEEE Information Theory Society
1998 Golden Jubilee Paper Award from the IEEE Information Theory Society
2000 Paper Award from the Japan Telecommunications Advancement Foundation, 
2002 Leonard G. Abraham Prize from the IEEE Communications Society (together with Ralf R. Müller), for best paper in the field of communications systems
2006 Communications Society & Information Theory Society Joint Paper Award from the IEEE Communications Society and the IEEE Information Theory Society
2008 EURASIP Journal on Wireless Communications and Networking Best Paper Award from the European Association for Signal Processing (EURASIP)
2009 Stephen O. Rice Prize from the IEEE Communications Society (together with Angel Lozano and Antonia Tulino), for best paper in the field of communications theory
2011 Information Theory Paper Award from the  IEEE Information Theory Society

He served as president of the IEEE Information Theory Society in 1997. 
He was the founding editor-in-chief of the journal Foundations and Trends in Communications and Information Theory.

References

External links 
 

1958 births
Living people
People from Barcelona
University of Illinois alumni
Members of the United States National Academy of Engineering
Members of the United States National Academy of Sciences
Information theorists
Fellow Members of the IEEE
Princeton University faculty
Polytechnic University of Catalonia alumni